Cozumel is an island and municipality in the Caribbean Sea off the eastern coast of Mexico's Yucatán Peninsula, opposite Playa del Carmen. It is separated from the mainland by the Cozumel Channel and is close to the Yucatán Channel. The municipality is part of the state of Quintana Roo, Mexico.

The economy of Cozumel is based on tourism, with visitors able to benefit from the island's balnearios, scuba diving, and snorkeling. The main town on the island is San Miguel de Cozumel.

Etymology
The name Cozumel was derived from the Mayan "Cuzamil" or "Ah Cuzamil Peten" in full, which means "the island of swallows".

Geography

The majority of the island's population lives in the town of San Miguel (pop. 77,236 in 2010), which is on the island's western shore.

Large parts of the island are covered with mangrove forest which has many endemic animal species. Cozumel is a flat island based on limestone, resulting in a karst topography. The cenotes are deep water-filled sinkholes formed by water percolating through the soft limestone soil for thousands of years. Cozumel's cenotes are restricted to qualified cave divers with appropriate credentials.

Fauna
Endemic species and subspecies of bird include:

 the Cozumel emerald
 the Cozumel great curassow, which is vulnerable
 the Cozumel thrasher, which is nearly, if not already, extinct
 the Cozumel vireo
 the Cozumel wren

Endemic dwarf mammals are found on the island:
 the Cozumel fox, which is nearly, if not already, extinct
 the Cozumel Island coati, which is endangered.
 the Cozumel Island raccoon, which is critically endangered

There are three rodents that are larger than their mainland counterparts: Oryzomys couesi, Peromyscus leucopus, and critically endangered Reithrodontomys spectabilis, the latter of which is also endemic to the island.

Endemic marine life:
 the splendid toadfish

Other native wildlife includes:
 the American crocodile
 the black spiny-tailed iguana
 the blue land crab (Cardisoma guanhumi)

Invasive species include:
 the boa constrictor

Coral reefs

Cozumel is surrounded by a diverse ecosystem of coral reefs that is home to more than 1,000 marine species. The reefs are primarily found on underwater cliffs, there are also some in coastal lagoons and on sand bars at the north tip of the island. They are part of the much larger Mesoamerican Barrier Reef System which is the second largest reef in the world, stretching over 1,000 kilometers (620 mi). Cozumel's deeper coral reefs were historically famed for their black corals, yet black coral populations declined from the 1960s to the mid-1990s because of overharvesting and by 2016 had not recovered. A huge portion of the reef on the south side of the island is sectioned off into the Arrecifes de Cozumel National Park. This park is protected under the Ramsar Convention along with Manglares y Humedales del Norte de Isla Cozumel, they both are included in the UNESCO protected area called Isla Cozumel Biosphere Reserve, Mexico. The site includes the coral reefs on the southern coast of Cozumel. The reefs in Cozumel are made up of hard coral and soft coral. The marine life that inhabit the reefs include zoanthids, polychaetes, actinarians, hydroids, sponges, crustaceans, mollusks, echinoderms and many varieties of Caribbean fish. The park is also a habitat to several endangered marine species such as the loggerhead sea turtle, hawksbill sea turtle, queen triggerfish, and the endemic splendid toadfish. Due to the abundant marine life and coral reefs the clear and warm Caribbean water, Cozumel is considered one of the best scuba-diving destinations in the world.

Climate
Cozumel has a tropical savanna climate under the Köppen climate classification that closely borders on a tropical monsoon climate. Thunderstorms can occasionally occur during the wet season. Temperatures tend to remain stable with little variation from month to month though the temperatures are cooler from December to February with the coolest month averaging . Owing to its proximity to the sea, the island is fairly humid, with an average humidity of 83%.

History

The Maya are believed to have first settled Cozumel by the early part of the 1st millennium AD, and older Preclassic Olmec artifacts have been found on the island as well. The island was sacred to Ix Chel, the Maya Moon Goddess, and the temples here were a place of pilgrimage, especially by women desiring fertility. There are a number of ruins on the island, most from the Post-Classic period. The largest Maya ruins on the island were near the downtown area and have now been destroyed. Today, the largest remaining ruins are at San Gervasio, located approximately at the center of the island.

The first Spanish expedition to visit Cozumel was led by Juan de Grijalva in 1518. In the following year Hernán Cortés stopped by the island on his way to Veracruz. The Grijalva and Cortés expeditions were both received peacefully by the Maya of Cozumel, unlike the expeditions' experiences on other parts of the mainland. Even after Cortés destroyed some of the Maya idols on Cozumel and replaced them with an image of the Virgin Mary, the native inhabitants of the island continued to help the Spanish re-supply their ships with food and water so they could continue their voyages. Gerónimo de Aguilar was rescued at this time.
As many as 10,000 Maya lived on the island then, but in 1520, infected crew members of the Pánfilo Narváez expedition brought the smallpox contagion to the island and by 1570 only 186 men and 172 women were left alive on Cozumel. In the ensuing years Cozumel was often the target of attacks by pirates, and in 1650 many of the islanders were forcibly relocated to the mainland town of Xcan Boloná to avoid the Buccaneers’ predation. Later, in 1688, most of the rest of the island's population, as well as many of the settlements along the Quintana Roo coast, were evacuated inland to towns such as Chemax. In 1848, refugees escaping the tumult of the Caste War of Yucatán settled on the island and in 1849 the town of San Miguel de Cozumel was officially recognized by the Mexican government.

In 1861, American President Abraham Lincoln ordered his Secretary of State, William Henry Seward, to meet with the Mexican chargé d'affaires Matias Romero to explore the possibility of purchasing the island of Cozumel for the purpose of relocating freed American slaves offshore. The idea was summarily dismissed by Mexican President Benito Juarez, but in 1862 Lincoln did manage to establish a short-lived colony of ex-slaves on Île à Vache off the coast of Haiti.

Although the original airport was a World War II relic and was able to handle jet aircraft and international flights, a much larger airport was built in the late 1970s.

Scuba diving is still one of Cozumel's primary attractions, mainly due to the coral reef on the western shore of Cozumel. These coral reefs are protected from the open ocean by the island's natural geography. In 1996, the government of Mexico also established the Cozumel Reefs National Marine Park, forbidding anyone from touching or removing any marine life within the park boundaries. Despite the importance of healthy reefs to Cozumel's tourist trade, a deepwater pier was built in the 1990s for cruise ships to dock, causing damage to the reefs, and it is now a regular stop on cruises in the Caribbean. Over the past few decades, coral reef health has significantly declined in Cozumel, with much lower coral cover now present than was historically recorded.

The island was struck directly by two Category 4 hurricanes during the 2005 Atlantic hurricane season. In July, Hurricane Emily passed just south of Cozumel, exposing the island to the storm's intense inner core. Despite Emily being a powerful storm, it was the larger, stronger, slower-moving Hurricane Wilma that caused the most destruction when it hit the island in October. Wilma's eye passed directly over Cozumel.

There was some damage to the underwater marine habitat. This included the coral reefs, which suffered particularly at the shallower dive sites, and the fish that inhabit the reefs.

Economy

Tourism, diving and charter fishing comprise the majority of the island's economy. There are more than 300 restaurants on the island and many hotels, some of which run dive operations, have swimming pools, private docks, and multiple dining facilities.

Other water activities include para-sailing, kitesurfing, and a tourist submarine. There are also two dolphinariums. At the cruise ship docks, there are several square blocks of stores selling Cuban cigars, jewelry, T-shirts, tequila, and a large variety of inexpensive souvenirs. Also, the only working pearl farm in the Caribbean is located on the north edge of the island.

San Miguel is home to many restaurants with a huge variety of different cuisines, along with several discothèques, bars, cinemas, and outdoor stages. The main plaza is surrounded by shops; in the middle of the plaza is a fixed stage where Cozumeleños and tourists celebrate every Sunday evening with music and dancing.

All food and manufactured supplies are shipped to the island. Water is provided by three different desalination facilities located on the island.

Education
There are three universities on the island: the State Public University of Quintana Roo (UQROO) and two private universities, the Partenon Institute and the Interamerican University for Development (UNID). In addition to teaching English as a degree program, they offer other career options including natural resources research, tourism and commercial systems.

Culture

Santa Cruz Festival and El Cedral Fair 
The Festival of Santa Cruz and El Cedral Fair is a historical tradition held in the town of El Cedral, in the south of Cozumel Island at the end of April. This annual event is said to have been started over 150 years ago by Casimiro Cárdenas. Cárdenas was one of a group that fled to the island from the village of Saban, on the mainland, after an attack during the Caste War of Yucatán in 1848. The attackers killed other villagers, but Cárdenas survived whilst clutching a small wooden cross.

Legend has it that Cárdenas vowed to start an annual festival wherever he settled, to honor the religious power of this crucifix. Today, the original Holy Cross (Santa Cruz) Festival forms part of the wider Festival of El Cedral, which includes fairs, traditional feasts, rodeos, bullfights, music and competitions. The celebrations last about five days in all and are held every year at the end of April or beginning of May.

Cozumel Carnival 
The Cozumel Carnival or Carnaval de Cozumel is one of the most important carnival festivities in México. It has been celebrated as a tradition beginning from the late nineteenth century and fills Cozumel's streets with parades. It begins the week before Mardi-Gras in February. Cozumel's Carnaval is a tradition which has been passed down through many generations that celebrates a mixture of cultures that escaped to the warm embrace of Cozumel. Dating back to the mid-1800s, Cozumel Carnaval was started by young people dressed in vibrantly colorful costumes known as "Estudiantinas" or "Comparsas", who expressed themselves in the streets of Cozumel through the artforms of dance, song, and fantasy.

Government

Cozumel Municipality is one of eleven municipalities of Quintana Roo. The municipal seat is located in San Miguel de Cozumel, the largest city in the municipality.

In popular culture

Cozumel is one of the locations featured in the 2006 video game Tom Clancy's Splinter Cell: Double Agent.
Cozumel and its Mayan ruins are featured in the program I Shouldn't Be Alive Season 6, Episode 5: "Lost In The Jungle".
Cozumel is one of the locations featured in the 2018 video game Shadow of the Tomb Raider.
Cozumel is featured as one of the primary settings and filming locations of the 1984 film, Against All Odds.

References

External links

 Cozumel Parks and Museums official site for the Quintana Roo State Foundation that manages Chankanaab Park, Punta Sur, San Gervasio and the Island Museum

 
Geography of Mesoamerica
Islands of Quintana Roo
Underwater diving sites in Mexico
Tourism in Mexico
Ramsar sites in Mexico
Populated places in Mexico